Boca de Río is a town on Isla Margarita, in the state of Nueva Esparta, Venezuela. It is the capital of the Macanao Peninsula Municipality.

Populated places in Nueva Esparta
Margarita Island